DWQ can refer to:

 Pannariaceae, a family of fungi, by Catalogue of Life identifier
 Daowai District, a district of Harbin, China; see List of administrative divisions of Heilongjiang